The 2022 Supercopa Peruana was a planned football super cup contested by the winners of the previous season's Liga 1 and Copa Bicentenario competitions.

The match will be played between the 2021 Copa Bicentenario champion, Sporting Cristal, and the winners of the 2021 Liga 1, Alianza Lima.

On August 23, it was announced that the Supercopa Peruana was canceled due to the reforms of Peruvian soccer by the FPF.

Qualified teams

Match details

References

External links 
Peruvian Football League News 

Football competitions in Peru
2022 in Peruvian football